Au cœur du stade is the fifth home video by Canadian singer Celine Dion, released on 30 August 1999. This 90-minute concert was recorded live in June 1999 at the Stade de France in Paris, France, during the Let's Talk About Love World Tour. During these two sold-out performances Dion sang in front of over 90,000 spectators at a single show for a total of over 180,000 in only two nights. The home video was certified Diamond in France.

Background
Jean-Jacques Goldman joined Dion on "J'irai où tu iras," "To Love You More" features Taro Hakase on violin, and Diana King can be seen on a screen during "Treat Her Like a Lady". Dion paid also tribute to the Bee Gees singing "Stayin' Alive" and dancing during "You Should Be Dancing". However, the performance of "Tell Him" with Barbra Streisand on a big screen was cut from the DVD.

The Au cœur du stade DVD also includes exclusive footage from the making of S'il suffisait d'aimer and Let's Talk About Love. It features an appearance by guest star Sir George Martin, and rarely seen footage of Dion, Barbra Streisand, David Foster, and the "Tell Him" lyricists Linda Thompson chatting around the piano. The entire "Tell Him" video is also included on this disk.

Au cœur du stade was certified Diamond in France in 2001 for selling over 100,000 copies.

Au cœur du stade CD is also available.

Track listing

Charts

Certifications

Release history

References

1999 video albums
Celine Dion video albums
Live video albums